The French Bilingual School of South Carolina (EFB) was an overseas French school in Greenville, South Carolina in unincorporated Greenville County, South Carolina, in the Greenville-Spartanburg area. The school served Kindergarten through the 12th grade and used the curriculum of the French Ministry of Education. The elementary section included grades K-5, the middle section included grades 6-9, and the high school section included grades 10-12. Michelin opened and operated the school for its employees expatriated to South Carolina. For that reason its official name was the Michelin French School. French expatriate families who did not work for Michelin were required to pay tuition.

History
The school opened in 1974 after Michelin opened its North American headquarters in the area. The number of students varied through the years between 55 and 130 and the number of teachers between 12 and 22.

The school permanently closed in June 2022.

Campus
The Greenville Saturday School (グリーンビル日本語補習授業校 Gurīnbiru Nihongo Hoshū Jugyō Kō), a Japanese Saturday supplementary school, used to hold its classes at the French Bilingual School.

References

External links
 French Bilingual School of South Carolina

French-American culture in South Carolina
Private elementary schools in South Carolina
Private middle schools in South Carolina
Private high schools in South Carolina
Schools in Greenville County, South Carolina
French international schools in the United States
Michelin